Mongo is a chiefdom in Falaba District of Sierra Leone with a population of 29,294. Its principal town is Bendugu.

References

Chiefdoms of Sierra Leone
Northern Province, Sierra Leone